This is a list of films produced in Japan in year order ordered by decade on separate pages.  For an A-Z of films see :Category:Japanese films.  Also see cinema of Japan.

List of Japanese films: Pre-1910
Japanese films of the 1910s
Japanese films of the 1920s
Japanese films of the 1930s
Japanese films of the 1940s
Japanese films of the 1950s
Japanese films of the 1960s
Japanese films of the 1970s
Japanese films of the 1980s
Japanese films of the 1990s
Japanese films of the 2000s
Japanese films of the 2010s
Japanese films of the 2020s
 List of highest-grossing Japanese films

See also
 Cinema of Japan
 Lists of highest-grossing Japanese films

External links
link not working properly*
 Japanese film at the Internet Movie Database